Gastroblastoma is a rare cancer that occurs in the stomach. Only six cases have been reported to date (2017)

A single case of a similar lesion has been reported in the duodenum. The term "duodenoblastoma" has been suggested for this lesion.

Signs and symptoms

These are non specific and include upper abdominal pain and fullness. Examination may reveal a mass. 

The lesion may be investigated further by ultrasound, CT or MRI but diagnosis depends on endoscopic biopsy.

This lesion appears to have an indolent course but metastases have been reported in one case to date.

Genetics

In four cases described a mutation - a fusion between the MALAT1 and GLI1 genes - has been described. This fusion causes over expression of the GLI1 protein and activation of the Sonic hedgehog pathway.

Disganosis

Histology

The tumour is biphasic and contains spindle and epithelial cells. The spindle cells form diffuse sheets. The epithelial cells occur in clusters which may form glandular structures.

Immunochemistry

The epithelial component is positive for keratin (keratin AE1/AE3, keratin 18, keratin 7) c-KIT and CD56. 

The mesenchymal component is positive for CD10 and vimentin.

Electron microscopy

Desmosomes and microvilli are present.

Differential diagnosis

The histological differential diagnosis includes

 Carcinosarcoma
 Biphasic synovial sarcoma
 Teratoma
 Mixed tumor

Other rare stomach tumours

Several other rare tumours that may need to be considered in the differential diagnosis include

 Multiple minute gastrointestinal stromal tumor
 Interstitial cell of Cajal hyperplasia
 Nerve sheath tumors (schwannoma and perineurioma)
 Granular cell tumor
 Glomus tumor
 Plexiform angiomyxoid myofibroblastic tumor
 Primary clear cell sarcoma

History

This tumour was first described in 2009. The authors described this lesion in two males and one female - ages 19, 27 and 30 years. Since its original description several further cases have been described.

References

Stomach cancer